Vitim Airport is a public use airport built in Vitim, Sakha (Yakutia) Republic, Russia during World War II for the Alaska-Siberian (ALSIB) air route used to ferry American Lend-Lease aircraft to the Eastern Front.

Airlines and destinations

References

Airports in the Sakha Republic